Egersunds Idrettsklubb, commonly known as Egersund or EIK, is a Norwegian sports club from Egersund in Rogaland. The club has sections for football, handball and athletics, and is most known for its football team, which plays in the 2. divisjon, the third tier of the Norwegian football league system.

History 
The inhabitants of Egersund first started playing football late in the 19th century, after influence from the English pottery-workers in the city. In the beginning the football was not organized, but during the spring of 1909 Egersund Fodboldsklubb was founded. The club, who played in kits with yellow and black stripes, did not play any competitive matches, but is today considered the forerunner of Egersunds IK. After the First World War, the gymnastics club Egersunds TF created a football-team, and Egersunds IK was founded in September 1919 when the football section of Egersunds TF broke out to create its own club. The club soon joined the Football Association of Norway, and played its first match against Vidar.

Egersunds IK first match in the Norwegian Cup was a 0–3 loss against Viking in the first round of the 1925 Norwegian Cup. The club played in local leagues until 1939, when they qualified for the top-tier of the new nationwide league, Norgesserien (League of Norway). The club's first season was interrupted by the Second World War, and when the league was reorganized after the war, Egersund ended up at the second tier. Further relegations followed, and the club has never been in the top tier of Norwegian football again. In 1957, Egersund were promoted to the second tier, and started one of the better periods of the club's history. A cup match away at Viking in Stavanger in 1960, drew a crowd of 4,269, the greatest attendance for any Egersund match, home or away. In the 1961 Norwegian Cup, Egersund eliminated Flekkefjord and Start to reach the third round of the Norwegian Cup, for the first time in history, where they lost 3–0 against Skeid at Bislett Stadion.

In the early 2000s, Egersund played most seasons in the 3. divisjon, regularly fighting for promotion to the 2. divisjon. In 2006, the club employed former Northern Ireland international Jimmy Quinn as manager, but he left after a brief time. In 2011, the club finished second in the 3. divisjon behind Start 2, As Start was relegated from Tippeligaen, their reserve could not play at the third tier and Egersund was promoted instead. The next season the team managed to survive a season in 2. divisjon without being relegated, for the first time in nearly 30 years. The club also reached the third round of the Norwegian Cup in 2012, for the first time since 1961, after eliminating Vidar 11–10 in a penalty shoot-out.

After five successful years at the helm, Jone Mathiesen resigned as head coach in late 2012, being replaced by former Norway international Bengt Sæternes. After an inconsistent 2013-season, Sæternes guided EIK to second place behind promoted Åsane in 2014, before leaving for Sandnes Ulf in November that year. He was replaced by former Swedish International Magnus Powell, who also managed to steer his team to a runners up spot behind Ullensaker/Kisa in 2015. Powell resigned in November 2015 to take over at Levanger FK. In December 2015 EIK appointed former Rangers player Maurice Ross as their new manager.

Notable footballers
Kjell Iversen was the first former Egersunds-player to represent Norway, when he made his debut against Kuwait in 1982. Bengt Sæternes is another former Egersund player that has been capped for Norway. Jørgen Tengesdal, Kai Ove Stokkeland, Johan Lædre Bjørdal, Valon Berisha, Veton Berisha, Zlatko Tripić and Stian Koldal has played in Tippeligaen after starting their career in Egersund. Most of these players have moved to Viking, which helps Egersund with development of young players. Tripic' transfer to Molde in 2011, caused resentment in Viking, who considered discontinuing the cooperation with Egersund.

Recent seasons
{|class="wikitable"
|-bgcolor="#efefef"
! Season
! 
! Pos.
! Pl.
! W
! D
! L
! GS
! GA
! P
!Cup
!Notes
|-
|2003
|3. divisjon
|align=right |3
|align=right|22||align=right|12||align=right|6||align=right|4
|align=right|53||align=right|31||align=right|42
|First round
|
|-
|2004
|3. divisjon
|align=right bgcolor=#DDFFDD| 1
|align=right|22||align=right|17||align=right|4||align=right|1
|align=right|57||align=right|17||align=right|55
|First round
|Promoted to 2. divisjon
|-
|2005
|2. divisjon
|align=right bgcolor="#FFCCCC"| 12
|align=right|26||align=right|5||align=right|8||align=right|13
|align=right|34||align=right|51||align=right|23
|First round
|Relegated to 3. divisjon
|-
|2006
|3. divisjon
|align=right |3
|align=right|22||align=right|13||align=right|3||align=right|6
|align=right|53||align=right|30||align=right|42
|First round
|
|-
|2007
|3. divisjon
|align=right |9
|align=right|26||align=right|9||align=right|6||align=right|11
|align=right|42||align=right|44||align=right|33
|First round
|
|-
|2008
|3. divisjon
|align=right |6
|align=right|26||align=right|13||align=right|4||align=right|9
|align=right|58||align=right|39||align=right|43
|First qualifying round
|
|-
|2009
|3. divisjon
|align=right |3
|align=right|26||align=right|17||align=right|4||align=right|5
|align=right|75||align=right|35||align=right|55
|First round
|
|-
|2010
|3. divisjon
|align=right |2
|align=right|26||align=right|19||align=right|1||align=right|6
|align=right|76||align=right|28||align=right|58
|Second qualifying round
|
|-
|2011
|3. divisjon
|align=right bgcolor=#DDFFDD| 2
|align=right|26||align=right|15||align=right|9||align=right|2
|align=right|83||align=right|23||align=right|54
|First round
|Promoted to 2. divisjon''
|-
|2012 
|2. divisjon
|align=right|10
|align=right|26||align=right|9||align=right|8||align=right|9
|align=right|46||align=right|45||align=right|35
|Third round
| 
|-
|2013
|2. divisjon
|align=right|7
|align=right|26||align=right|10||align=right|5||align=right|11
|align=right|41||align=right|45||align=right|35
|Second round
| 
|-
|2014
|2. divisjon
|align=right|2
|align=right|26||align=right|14||align=right|6||align=right|6
|align=right|48||align=right|36||align=right|48
|Third round
| 
|-
|2015
|2. divisjon
|align=right|2
|align=right|26||align=right|16||align=right|7||align=right|3
|align=right|55||align=right|22||align=right|55
|First round
| 
|-
|2016
|2. divisjon
|align=right|3
|align=right|26||align=right|13||align=right|4||align=right|9
|align=right|48||align=right|28||align=right|43
|Second round
| 
|-
|2017 
|2. divisjon
|align=right|9
|align=right|26||align=right|8||align=right|10||align=right|8
|align=right|40||align=right|29||align=right|34
|Third round
| 
|-
|2018 
|2. divisjon
|align=right|4
|align=right|26||align=right|12||align=right|8||align=right|6
|align=right|47||align=right|28||align=right|44
|Third round
| 
|-
|2019
|2. divisjon
|align=right|4
|align=right|26||align=right|13||align=right|6||align=right|7
|align=right|60||align=right|36||align=right|45
|Second round
| 
|-
|2020
|2. divisjon
|align=right|3
|align=right|19||align=right|10||align=right|4||align=right|5
|align=right|48||align=right|22||align=right|34
|Cancelled
| 
|-
|2021
|2. divisjon
|align=right|3
|align=right|26||align=right|15||align=right|3||align=right|8
|align=right|55||align=right|40||align=right|48
|First round
|
|-
|2022
|2. divisjon
|align=right|3
|align=right|24||align=right|13||align=right|6||align=right|5
|align=right|51||align=right|29||align=right|45
|Second round
|
|}
Source:

Players

Current squad

Athletics
The club hosted the Norwegian half-marathon championships in 1990, the relays championship in 1996, and the short course cross-country running championships in 2009.

References

External links
 Official site
 Club page at fotball.no

 
Football clubs in Norway
Association football clubs established in 1919
Sport in Rogaland
1919 establishments in Norway
Eigersund
Athletics clubs in Norway